3β-Methoxypregnenolone (developmental code name MAP-4343), or pregnenolone 3β-methyl ether, also known as 3β-methoxypregn-5-en-20-one, is a synthetic neuroactive steroid and derivative of pregnenolone. It interacts with microtubule-associated protein 2 (MAP2) in a similar manner to pregnenolone and is under development for potential clinical use for indications such as the treatment of brain and spinal cord injury and depressive disorders.

See also
 List of investigational antidepressants
 List of neurosteroids

References

Antidepressants
Neuroprotective agents
Neurosteroids
Pregnanes